Ophichthus melope is an eel in the family Ophichthidae (worm/snake eels). It was described by John E. McCosker and Richard Heinrich Rosenblatt in 1998. It is a marine, tropical eel which is known from the eastern central and southeastern Pacific Ocean, including Colombia and Costa Rica.

The species epithet "melope" means "black cavity" in Greek, and is treated as a noun in apposition. It refers to the rings surrounding the pores. Due to a lack of known threats and observed population decline, the IUCN redlist currently lists O. melope as Least Concern.

References

black-pored snake-eel
Fish of Costa Rica
Fish of Colombia
Taxa named by John E. McCosker
Taxa named by Richard Heinrich Rosenblatt
black-pored snake-eel